Current Bioinformatics is a peer-reviewed open access scientific journal, published by Bentham Science Publishers, covering areas such as such as computing in biomedicine and genomics, computational proteomics and systems biology, and
metabolic pathway engineering.

Abstracting and indexing 
The journal is abstracted and indexed in Scopus, Biological Abstracts, BIOSIS, BIOSIS Previews, EMBASE, ProQuest, EMBiology, Genamics, JournalSeek, MediaFinder®-Standard Periodical Directory, PubsHub, J-Gate, CNKI Scholar, Suweco CZ, EBSCO and Chemical Abstracts Service.

References

External links 
 

Creative Commons Attribution-licensed journals
English-language journals
Bentham Science Publishers academic journals